Lost in Time is a 2003 Hong Kong drama film directed by Derek Yee and starring Cecilia Cheung, Lau Ching-Wan and Louis Koo.

Plot 
Siu Wai is a young woman whose fiancé has been killed in an accident. She takes on her late fiancé's minibus business in order to support his young son, Lok Lok. As Siu Wai struggles in the cutthroat business, she is befriended by Dai Fai, another minibus driver who was at the scene of her fiancé's accident. Dai Fai takes pity on her plight and he regularly assists Siu Wai, from taking care of Lok Lok to teaching her the ropes of minibus driving.

Cast
 Cecilia Cheung as Siu Wai
 Lau Ching-Wan as Dai Fai
 Louis Koo as Ah Man
 Chan Wai-Man as Uncle Seven
 Paul Chun as Siu Wai's dad
 Daichi Harashima - Lok Lok
 Elena Kong as Sharon, Siu Wai's sister
 Johnny Lu as Sharon's husband  
 Lee San-San as Ah Man's ex-wife
 Jamie Luk
 Paw Hee-Ching as Siu Wai's mom
 Edmond So as Elvis

Awards

References

External links

Hong Kong drama films
2000s Cantonese-language films
2003 films
China Star Entertainment Group films
Films directed by Derek Yee
Films with screenplays by James Yuen
Films about buses
Films about businesspeople
2000s Hong Kong films